Dave Konopka is an American musician who is best known as the former bassist and guitarist in the experimental rock band Battles. A graphic design major at the Massachusetts College of Art and Design, he also designed the band's record covers and tour posters. Konopka departed Battles in 2018.

Biography

Prior to joining Battles, he was in the Boston-based math rock band Lynx, which released a self-titled debut album on Box Factory Records in 2000.

Setup

(2011 – Present)
Guitars

 Gibson Les Paul '57 custom Black Beauty
 G&L ASAT Bass

Pedals
 Line 6 DL4 – X 2
 EHX POG2
 EHX Micro POG
 EHX Holy Grail Reverb
 EHX Freeze Sound Retainer
 Fulltone OCD Distortion Pedal
 Boss Pitch Shifter Delay – X 2
 Boss TU-3 Chromatic Floor Tuner
 Boss AB-2
 Xotic EP – Booster

Rack Mount Units
 Gibson Echoplex – X 2 w/Footswitches

Amplifiers
 Mesa Boogie M9 Carbine Bass Amplifier – X 2
 Ampeg B-115e Cabinet
 Bergantino 4x12 Cabinet
 Bergantino 6x10 Cabinet

Discography

As a band member 

 Lynx – Lynx (2000)
 Battles – EP C / B EP (2006)
 Battles – Mirrored (2007)
 Battles – Gloss Drop (2011)
 Battles – La Di Da Di (2015)

Singles
 "Tras" (June 15, 2004, 12")
 "Atlas" (April 2007, 12")
 "Tonto" (October 2007)
 "The Line" (August 2010, digital download)
 "Ice Cream" (March 2011, 12")
 "My Machines" (August 2011, 12")

As a contributor 

 Tonto+ (Warp Records; October 22, 2007 world, November 6, 2007 USA)
 Dross Glop 1 (first in a four-part 12" vinyl remix series; Warp Records; February 6/7, 2012)
 Dross Glop 2 (second in four-part 12" vinyl remix series; Warp Records; February 20/21, 2012)
 Dross Glop 3 (third in four-part 12" vinyl remix series; Warp Records; March 19/20, 2012)
 Dross Glop 4 (fourth and final in four-part 12" vinyl remix series; Warp Records; Record Store Day, April 21, 2012)
 Dross Glop (CD compilation of the four-part 12" vinyl remixes; April 16/17, 2012)

References 

Living people
1976 births
American rock guitarists
American male guitarists
Battles (band) members
21st-century American guitarists
21st-century American male musicians